The Cecilia Chorus of New York, formerly known as the St. Cecilia Chorus, is an avocational chorus and nonprofit organization based in New York City.

With a membership of approximately 180 singers, the chorus performs twice annually at Carnegie Hall with a professional orchestra and soloists, as well as at other New York–area venues.

History

Early Years

A secular, unaffiliated organization, the Chorus was founded in 1906 as a women's chorus. Its nucleus formed in 1900 when a small group of women began meeting to sing together at each other's Manhattan homes on Tuesday mornings. The principal organizers were Susan Warren and Mrs. Henry Burden; the pianist and leader was Elliot Schenck. Warren, Burden and their colleagues established an all-women's chorus which they named the Tuesday Morning Singing Club. Membership was by invitation only, and rehearsals were held at the Waldorf Astoria Hotel. In 1906, the Tuesday Morning Singing Club invited Metropolitan Opera coach Victor Harris to be their conductor. Harris accepted on the conditions that rehearsals be held at his studio and that the musical work be in earnest. Thus was the "Saint Cecilia Club" founded in 1906. Under Harris's leadership the Saint Cecilia Club grew rapidly to become a prominent choral organization in New York City.

In 1922, while still a women's group (as it remained until 1965), the Chorus won significant attention when it appeared with The Philharmonic Society of New York under Willem Mengelberg in the first New York performance of Mahler's Symphony No. 3. During this period, the Chorus gave several dozen world and U.S. premieres, by composers including Amy Beach, Deems Taylor, and Virgil Thomson.

Harris continued as the Chorus's Music Director until 1936; he was succeeded by Léon Barzin (1936–37), Willard Sektberg (1937–42), Hugh Ross (1942–195?), David Buttolph (195?–1965), David Randolph (1965–2010) and Mark Shapiro (since 2011).

David Randolph
In 1965, when David Buttolph resigned, Chorus members recalled that they had enjoyed working with David Randolph when he substituted at a rehearsal in October 1959. The Chorus tapped Randolph to become their sixth Music Director; he continued in this role until his death in 2010. Under Randolph's direction, the Chorus grew in size and ability, and in 1969 performed its first concert in Carnegie Hall. In addition to its twice-yearly Carnegie Hall concerts, some of which were broadcast live on WNYC Radio, Randolph led the Chorus in other major venues, including Lincoln Center's Avery Fisher Hall (now David Geffen Hall).

In April 1981, prompted by the popularity of the Broadway play Amadeus, the Chorus performed a program in Carnegie Hall featuring the U.S. premiere of Antonio Salieri's Mass No. 1 juxtaposed with Mozart's Great Mass in C minor. The program was broadcast on WNYC. Amadeus author Peter Shaffer attended and spoke from the stage.

In December 1986, also in Carnegie Hall, the Chorus gave the North American premiere of Oratorium nach Bildern der Bibel by Fanny Mendelssohn, sister of Felix Mendelssohn.

During his 37 years with The Masterwork Chorus, Randolph specialized in conducting Handel's Messiah. These performances became a seasonal tradition in New York City. In 1995, Randolph directed the St. Cecilia Chorus in its first performances of Messiah. The two performances at Carnegie Hall were notably successful. By popular demand the work was brought back for two performances on December 20, 1997, and for performances led by Randolph in 2005 and 2008, and by his successor Mark Shapiro in 2011, 2013, 2015 and subsequently.

In 1993, members of the Chorus made a recording with Liza Minnelli for the benefit of AIDS research. In 1996, a small group of Chorus members appeared as Christmas carolers in The Preacher's Wife, a major motion picture starring Whitney Houston and Denzel Washington.

During Randoph's tenure, the Chorus also performed under other conductors including Lukas Foss, John Alldis, John Nelson, Romano Gandolfi [it] (La Scala), Peter Tiboris, and Eve Queler (Opera Orchestra of New York).[3]

Mark Shapiro

In July 2011, after a national search, Mark Shapiro was appointed the seventh Music Director of the Chorus. In 2012, to more clearly represent its secular, unaffiliated mission, the Chorus changed its name to The Cecilia Chorus of New York.

Under Shapiro, the Chorus, while maintaining its engagement with standard repertoire, embarked on a new path of commissioning and premiering works at Carnegie Hall as well as other venues. Concurrently, the Chorus revitalized its commitment to showcasing neglected masterpieces from the past. Commissioned composers have included The Brothers Balliett, Jonathan Breit, Tom Cipullo, Raphael Fusco and Zaid Jabri. The Chorus's performance of Tom Cipullo's Credo for a Secular City  (2014) was honored in 2015 with the Chorus America/ASCAP Alice Parker Award.

Other notable accomplishments include the long-delayed New York premieres, both in Carnegie Hall, of two major works by Dame Ethel Smyth: the Mass in D (1891), which the Chorus performed in 2013, and The Prison (1930), which the Chorus performed in 2018.  In 2012 the Chorus presented a rare revival of The Christmas Story (1949) by neglected American composer Peter Mennin, a former president of The Juilliard School, and a Marian Trilogy by early Baroque composer Isabella Leonarda. In 2018, the Chorus gave the North American premiere of the Messe Romane by Thierry Escaich. The Chorus's 2019 performance of a program in tribute to Walt Whitman, including a premiere by Jorge Martín and music by the neglected nineteenth century American composer John Knowles Paine, was broadcast on the public radio series "Pipe Dreams."

In March 2020, on the eve of the COVID-19 pandemic that ravaged New York City as well as many other localities, the Chorus performed The Belshazzar Project, a curated evening in five languages of settings of the Belshazzar story from The Book of Daniel ("You are weighed in the balance, and found wanting."). Composers included Alexandre Guilmant, G. F. Handel, Arseny Koreshchenko, Gioacchino Rossini and Robert Schumann, as well as Johnny Cash, Penny Prince and Harold Rome. The program additionally featured spoken texts by Byron, Dickinson and others, which were read by actor Kathleen Chalfant.

Repertoire 
Below is a list of performances since 1966.

Performances from 2011 and later conducted by Mark Shapiro, unless otherwise indicated.

Performances from 1966 through 2010 conducted by David Randolph, unless otherwise indicated.

References

External links 

St. Cecilia Chorus records in the Music Division of the New York Public Library for the Performing Arts
St. Cecilia Chorus Collection of Sound Recordings, 1967–, Rodgers and Hammerstein Archives of Recorded Sound. New York Public Library

Choirs in New York City
Musical groups established in 1906
1906 establishments in New York City